On April 26, 1987, Kerrick Majors, a 14-year-old African-American boy, was tortured and murdered during a racially-motivated hate crime by three white drifters in East Nashville, Tennessee. Majors was attacked by the trio after he and his friends accidentally broke a $2 vase at a flea market. Majors was kidnapped, tortured, beaten, and stabbed to death, while his attackers yelled racial slurs at him. His body was found the following day.

Donald Ray Middlebrooks, Tammy Middlebrooks, and Robert Brewington, all white, were convicted of his murder. Donald Middlebrooks was sentenced to death, while Tammy Middlebrooks and Brewington received life sentences. The police were criticized for their handling of the case and were accused of being racially biased. Majors' family later sued the Metro government and said the police's slow response to Majors' disappearance led to his death.

The case was notable due to its brutal nature, alleged racial bias from the police, and because it marked a rare occasion in which a white person received a death sentence for murdering a black person. Middlebrooks was scheduled to be executed in December 2022, but his execution was later suspended. If executed, Middlebrooks will be the first white person in modern Tennessee history to be executed for killing a black person.

Murder
On the evening of Sunday, April 26, 1987, 14-year-old Kerrick Majors, accompanied by four of his friends, headed to Gallatin Road in East Nashville, Tennessee. At around 7:00 p.m., the group came across a table covered in stuff that belonged to three white homeless people: 24-year-old Donald Ray Middlebrooks, his wife, 17-year-old Tammy Middlebrooks, and their companion, 16-year-old Robert Roger Brewington Jr., who was a runaway. The trio had been setting up a flea market to sell various items. As Majors and his friends approached the table, Tammy shouted at them to leave the stuff alone. During the commotion, a vase, which was later estimated to be valued at $2, was broken. Majors and his friends began running and were chased down by the trio. The trio caught Majors, and Brewington grabbed him around his neck and head. Majors resisted and told the group they knew who he was. Brewington responded by shouting racial slurs at him. Two of Majors' friends then saw Donald Middlebrooks and Brewington take Majors back to the table, where Middlebrooks struck him across the face, knocking him to the ground. Later that night, Majors' friends told his mother, Deborah, what had happened. She then called the police.

Majors was taken into a wooded area behind a drug store on Gallatin Road. He was tied up, and Tammy stayed watching him while Donald and Brewington searched for Majors' friends. After failing to find them, they returned. The trio then made Majors strip off his clothes before beating and kicking him repeatedly. Majors was then tortured for several hours. He was slapped, beaten with brass knuckles, hit with a stick, and urinated on by either Donald or Brewington. Donald later admitted to striking Majors and hitting him on the leg with a switch. He also claimed Tammy burned Majors' nose with a cigarette lighter while Brewington urged them on. Brewington also admitted to hitting Majors in the face with a wooden stick. A letter "X" was also carved into his chest with a knife. After being tortured, Majors was stabbed twice in the chest with an assault knife. Middlebrooks later claimed that both he and Brewington stabbed Majors once each. In a previous statement, however, he claimed to have inflicted both stab wounds. Brewington claimed Middlebrooks inflicted both stab wounds. Majors then succumbed to his injuries and died at the scene.

Aftermath

Search and discovery of body
After learning of her son's disappearance, Deborah Majors called the police. An officer was then dispatched to her house. He took a missing person's report; however, no search was initiated. The officer's supervisor chose not to drive to Majors' home. Furthermore, the responding officer failed to interview Majors' friend, who had witnessed the initial assault. After the police did not carry out a search, Majors' family and friends began looking for him.

The following morning, on April 27, Deborah went to a juvenile court to report Majors' disappearance. The court listed him as a runaway, and Deborah was told no one was available to look for her son. After a friend of Majors' got out of school that afternoon, the friend, Majors' mother, grandfather, and brother, all began searching for him. At around 3:30 p.m., Majors' naked body was found lying face up in a dry creek bed under a foam mattress in the woods near the area where Majors had been abducted. Bruises and burns covered his body, and the letter "X" was carved across his chest. Urine was also found on different parts of his body, and a bloody stick lay near his head. Two deep stab wounds were found in his chest a couple of inches apart. An autopsy later determined the cause of death was a stab wound to the chest. The letter "X" had been carved into his chest before the fatal stab wound had been inflicted.

Investigation
In the early hours of April 28, police met with Brewington at a doughnut shop after he called them and asked to meet them there. Once they arrived, he voluntarily informed them that Donald and Tammy Middlebrooks were involved in the murder. However, he denied any involvement in the crime himself. He also directed the officers to the location of the murder weapon, which was covered in bloodstains. Brewington also told police where to find Donald and Tammy. Hours later, the pair were arrested at a shack. Donald and Tammy both resisted arrest. Tammy tried to run but was bitten by a police dog and arrested. Donald refused to leave the shack and stood his ground while armed with a knife. With the aid of police dogs, he was arrested and taken to the hospital for treatment of dog bites before being transported to police headquarters.

Both Middlebrooks and Brewington blamed the other as the instigator of the crime. Middlebrooks claimed Brewington had killed Majors in a "satanic ritual" and had murdered him as an offering to the devil. He also claimed Brewington had beat, gagged, sexually molested, and stabbed Majors. He did admit to stabbing him once, however.

While awaiting sentencing, Brewington was raped by another inmate. While in prison at the Tennessee State Penitentiary, Donald Middlebrooks was attacked by black inmates in retaliation for the crime. He also received death threats. As such, he faked a suicide attempt to gain protection by slashing his own throat. The judge in his trial then agreed to a transfer request and Middlebrooks was moved from the Penitentiary to the Metro Jail.

Criticism of police's response
On May 8, 1987, Metro Police Chief Joe Casey suspended two police officers for improperly investigating the disappearance of Majors. One of the two received the harshest punishment short of termination. Sergeant Robert Graves received a suspension of thirty days without pay, and Officer Robert Swisher was suspended twenty working days without pay. Casey accused them of being lax. After Deborah called the police, Officer Swisher was dispatched to her home. He took a missing person report and notified officers in the Juvenile Division; however, he did not initiate a search, which department policy required. Sergeant Graves, Swisher's supervisor, should have headed to the scene but failed to do so. Swisher did not interview Majors' friend, who had witnessed the kidnapping. However, Casey and the Assistant Police Chief agreed that even a proper police investigation would not have saved Majors' life as they concluded he had been killed before the call was made.

Majors' grandfather reacted to the suspension with disapproval. He called the punishment a "slap on the wrist" and argued they should not have a job. As both officers were white, he claimed they would have responded differently had Majors also been white. Casey said both officers had assured him that their laxness was not due to racial bias.

On April 25, 1988, Majors' parents filed a $2 million civil damage suit against the Metro government. They asked for $1 million in compensatory damages and another $1 million in punitive damages. They argued that the slow response from the Metro Police Department to Deborah's missing persons report led to Majors' death. Police later apologized for failing to begin a full search for Majors immediately after the call was made. However, they said it appeared he had been killed before they were notified he was missing. However, according to Richard Jackson, the Majors' family attorney, an autopsy report prepared by the Metro medical examiner showed that Majors had died sometime after his mother had called the police for help.

Trials
On June 22, 1988, Brewington was found guilty of the kidnapping, robbery, and murder of Majors. He was convicted of all charges, including first-degree murder, which carried an automatic life sentence. During his trial, he did not take the witness stand. On December 15, 1988, Criminal Court Judge Ann Lacy Johns imposed the maximum possible sentence on Brewington; life plus seventy-five years. He was also convicted of aggravated kidnapping and armed robbery. He had supposedly shown no remorse for murdering Majors. He was spared a death sentence as he was a juvenile at the time of the murder.

On January 27, 1989, Tammy Middlebrooks was sentenced to life in prison after pleading guilty to assisting in the kidnapping and killing of Majors. She was ordered to spend a minimum of seventeen years in prison at the Tennessee Prison for Women before being eligible for parole. Like Brewington, she too was spared the death penalty as she was a juvenile at the time of the murder.

In September 1989, the trial of Donald Middlebrooks began, with jury selection being made on September 11. The prosecution announced they would be seeking the death penalty. On September 19, 1989, Middlebrooks was found guilty of first-degree murder and aggravated kidnapping. However, he was charged with murder committed in the commission of a felony, instead of premeditated murder, with the felony being kidnapping. Both charges were considered first-degree murder, which made him eligible for the death penalty. Middlebrooks' defense attorneys argued he should be spared from a death sentence as he had severe mental illness.

On September 22, 1989, Middlebrooks was sentenced to death in the electric chair. As the sentence was announced, Middlebrooks grinned and mouthed, "thank god." According to his sister, he had been expecting a death sentence. After the sentence was announced, Majors' family expressed relief at the verdict. Majors' brother believed Middlebrooks deserved the death penalty. Majors' father, John Majors, said, "I think it was one of the most fair things I've seen done in this town on behalf of a black person. Sometimes we, as blacks, do not expect Justice." He expressed his belief that he had not always supported the death penalty because it was often used disproportionately against black defendants, but the rising crime rates in recent years changed his mind. He also expected less commitment from the state in prosecuting a white defendant on behalf of a black family. He was impressed with the vigor of the prosecution on his family's behalf.

During the trial, prosecutors interjected race into the case. Middlebrooks' attorney later expressed his belief that some white jurors may have seen the case as an opportunity to use Middlebrooks as an example that when a white person kills a black person, the appropriate punishment will be meted out.

Second trial of Donald Middlebrooks
In 1992, Middlebrooks' death sentence was overturned due to a ruling by the Tennessee Supreme Court. The ruling tightened the rules for imposing a death sentence when someone was killed during the commission of another crime, with the Majors' case being kidnapping and murder. The Supreme Court affirmed Middlebrooks' kidnapping and felony murder convictions but entitled him to a new sentencing hearing on the murder charge. Davidson County prosecutors decided to seek the death penalty against him again. In September 1995, a new hearing was scheduled for October.

On October 2, 1995, the second trial for Middlebrooks began. During this trial, the prosecution portrayed Middlebrooks as a racist, arguing the crime had been a racially motivated hate crime, citing the racial slurs that been made toward Majors during the attack. One of Majors' friends who had witnessed Majors being grabbed had heard Middlebrooks say to him, "shut up nigger." He also testified that he had spoken with Middlebrooks on the morning of the murder. Middlebrooks had supposedly told him that he was a member of the Ku Klux Klan, hated black people, and had once punched a black man just for saying hello to him. Middlebrooks' younger half-sister testified that he was not a racist, had black friends, and had been cared for by a black woman, whom he had loved.

On October 11, Deborah Majors, for the third time, told a jury about her son's murder, having done so at Brewington's trial and at Middlebrooks' first trial. On October 13, 1995, Donald Middlebrooks was sentenced to death again. This time he showed no emotion after the announcement. In January 1998, the court upheld his death sentence. The appeals court noted that race "was an integral dynamic of the circumstances surrounding this murder."

In September 1998, a lawyer told the Tennessee Supreme Court that prosecutors had "played the race card" to convince a Davidson County jury to sentence Middlebrooks to death. In July 1999, the Tennessee Supreme Court affirmed Middlebrooks' death sentence and said the prosecution was justified in presenting evidence that race was a factor in the murder of Majors. They ruled racial prejudice was relevant to show premeditation and a motive for the killing.

Scheduled execution of Donald Middlebrooks
On September 20, 2019, Tennessee filed a motion to set an execution date for Middlebrooks as he had run out of appeals. On December 30, Middlebrooks filed a response opposing the motion and asked for a certificate of commutation. The Court's consideration of both the motion and response was delayed due to the COVID-19 pandemic.

In November 2020, Middlebrooks tested positive for COVID-19. Following his positive result, the unit that housed Tennessee's death row prisoners was put on lockdown.

In February 2022, Middlebrooks' request for a certificate of commutation was denied. On February 20, the Court allowed the execution to be scheduled. His execution was scheduled for December 8, 2022.

On May 2, 2022, Governor Bill Lee issued temporary reprieves to Middlebrooks and four other Tennessee death row inmates who had been scheduled for execution in 2022. Lee issued the reprieves after discovering that the state had failed to properly test the lethal injection drugs that were set to be used in the execution of Oscar Franklin Smith in April. Lee opened an investigation into why the error had occurred. He also suspended all executions for the remainder of 2022 to allow time for the review and corrective action to be put in place.

Middlebrooks remains on death row and is imprisoned at the Riverbend Maximum Security Institution awaiting execution.

See also

References

1987 in Tennessee
1987 murders in the United States
African-American history in Nashville, Tennessee
April 1987 events in the United States
Capital murder cases
Capital punishment in Tennessee
Deaths by stabbing in Tennessee
History of racism in Tennessee
Murder in Tennessee
Race-related controversies in the United States
Racially motivated violence against African Americans
Torture in the United States